Joseph Bock (January 6, 1837March 14, 1925) was an Alsatian American immigrant, real estate dealer, and banker.  He served two terms in the Wisconsin State Assembly, representing Grant County.  During the American Civil War, he served in the famed Iron Brigade of the Army of the Potomac.

Biography
Bock was born on January 6, 1837, in the Alsace region of the Kingdom of France. In 1857, Bock emigrated to the United States.  He settled first at St. Louis, Missouri, then, later that year, moved to Cassville, Wisconsin.

During the American Civil War, Bock served in the 2nd Wisconsin Infantry Regiment. Engagements he took part in include the First Battle of Bull Run and the Battle of Fredericksburg. He went on to be wounded in both thighs. Although he initially remained with the regiment, his injuries eventually left him unable to continue.

He died on March 14, 1925, and was buried in Hillside Cemetery in Lancaster, Wisconsin.

Political career
Bock was a member of the Assembly from 1876 to 1877. Previously, he was Register of Deeds of Grant County, Wisconsin. He was a Republican.

References

See also
 
RootsWeb 

1837 births
1925 deaths
People from Cassville, Wisconsin
Republican Party members of the Wisconsin State Assembly
People of Wisconsin in the American Civil War
Union Army soldiers
Alsatian people
French emigrants to the United States